Claude Vincendeau (born 21 December 1954) is a French former professional racing cyclist. He rode in four editions of the Tour de France, two editions of the Giro d'Italia and one edition of the Vuelta a España.

References

External links
 

1954 births
Living people
French male cyclists
Sportspeople from Vendée
Cyclists from Pays de la Loire